Parminolia apicina is a species of sea snail, a marine gastropod mollusk in the family Trochidae.

Description
The small, white shell has an ovate-conic shape and is spirally striate. The interstices, with the aid of lens, appear finely striate longitudinally. The shell is ornated around the sutures with bright, rose-colored, equidistant flamules. The five convex whorls, including the apex, are obtuse at the periphery. The sutures are immersed; between the sutures the spire is angulated. The convex base of the shell shows somewhat granulate incremental lines. At the periphery the spiral rib is encircled with minute pink dots. The small umbilicus is deep and narrow and has a marginal callus. The aperture is almost circular. The peristome is thickened and a little relfexed.

Distribution
This marine species occurs off the Loyalty Islands, Marshall Islands, and off Queensland, Australia

References

 Gould, A.A. 1861. Descriptions of shells collected by the North Pacific Exploring Expedition (continued). Proceedings of the Boston Society of Natural History 8: 14-40
 Ladd, H.S. 1966. Chitons and gastropods (Haliotidae through Adeorbidae) from the western Pacific Islands. United States Geological Survey Professional Papers 531: 1-98 16 pls 
 Wilson, B. 1993. Australian Marine Shells. Prosobranch Gastropods. Kallaroo, Western Australia : Odyssey Publishing Vol. 1 408 pp

External links
 To World Register of Marine Species

apicina
Gastropods described in 1861